Trindade is a station on the Porto Metro system in Porto, Portugal.

History

The modern metro station was built on the site of the former Trindade railway station, which was the central terminus for services to Porto from Trofa, Póvoa do Varzim and the Guimarães line. Trindade was also the main entry point for the tunnelling machine which excavated the tunnels for Line D in central Porto.

Services

It is the only station where Lines A, B, C, E and F (which run as one line within the metropolitan area) intersect with Line D. It is in the centre of Porto and is the busiest station in the system by passenger numbers. On Lines A, B, C, E, and F it is preceded by Bolhão and followed by Lapa, while on Line D it is preceded by Aliados and followed by Faria Guimarães. The platforms for the A/B/C/E/F lines are at ground level under a sheltered roof, while the Line D trains are underground.

Passengers 
In 2004, 14.8% of all ticket validations on the network were made at Trindade, down from 23.7% the previous year due to the opening of the Bolhão and Estádio do Dragão stations, but still comfortably the highest.

The station entrance and lower concourse are often used for fundraising and promotional events.

Building

Design
The station was designed by the renowned Portuguese architect and Pritzker Prize winner Eduardo Souto de Moura.

Layout

The platforms for the ABCEF line are at ground level under a sheltered roof. On this level, there are three platforms, with one being the old terminus for line Bx, which has since moved to Estádio do Dragão. To get to the far go-through platform for trains heading north, there is an underpass. The line D trains are underground, and the underpass must also be used to get to line D, whose platforms are underneath the underpass.

References

External links

Porto Metro stations
Eduardo Souto de Moura buildings
Railway stations opened in 2002